Radosław Kanach (born 3 April 1999) is a Polish professional footballer who plays as a midfielder for Resovia.

Club career
Kanach started his career with III liga side Stal Rzeszów, where he made 33 appearances over two seasons. He signed for Ekstraklasa side Cracovia in June 2016. His first involvement with the first team was in a mid-season training camp in Spain; where he played in matches against Chinese side Yanbian Funde and Moldovan side Dacia Chișinău. He made his league debut in a 4–1 loss to Wisła Płock, picking up a yellow card in the 9th minute.

International career
In 2013, while a player with Stal Rzeszów, Kanach was called up to the Polish under-15 side. In October 2016, he was called up to the under-18 side, and played in two matches against Finland.

Career statistics

Notes

References 

1999 births
People from Rzeszów
Living people
Polish footballers
Poland youth international footballers
Association football midfielders
MKS Cracovia (football) players
Stal Rzeszów players
Sandecja Nowy Sącz players
Resovia (football) players
Ekstraklasa players
I liga players
III liga players